Andrés Sabido Martín (born 13 November 1957) is a Spanish retired footballer who played as a defender.

Honours
Real Madrid
La Liga: 1977–78, 1978–79, 1979–80
Copa del Rey: 1979–80, 1981–82

References

1957 births
Living people
Footballers from Madrid
Spanish footballers
Association football defenders
La Liga players
Segunda División players
Tercera División players
Real Madrid Castilla footballers
Real Madrid CF players
RCD Mallorca players
CA Osasuna players
Spain youth international footballers
Spain under-21 international footballers
Spain under-23 international footballers
Spain amateur international footballers